This is a list of Estonian television related events from 1997.

Events
27 January - Maarja-Liis Ilus is selected to represent Estonia at the 1997 Eurovision Song Contest with her song "Keelatud maa". She is selected to be the third Estonian Eurovision entry during Eurolaul held at the Linnahall in Tallinn.

Debuts

Television shows

1990s
Õnne 13 (1993–present)

Ending this year

Births

Deaths